Events from the year 1923 in Michigan.

Office holders

State office holders
 Governor of Michigan: Alex J. Groesbeck (Republican)
 Lieutenant Governor of Michigan: Thomas Read (Republican) 
 Michigan Attorney General: Merlin Wiley (Republican), Andrew B. Dougherty (Republican)
 Michigan Secretary of State: Charles J. DeLand (Republican)
 Speaker of the Michigan House of Representatives: George W. Welsh (Republican)
 Majority Leader of the Michigan Senate:
 Chief Justice, Michigan Supreme Court:

Mayors of major cities
 Mayor of Detroit: John C. Lodge (Republican)/Frank Ellsworth Doremus (Democrat)
 Mayor of Grand Rapids: William Oltman/Julius Tisch
 Mayor of Flint: William H. McKeighan/David R. Cuthbertson
 Mayor of Lansing: Silas F. Main/Alfred H. Doughty

Federal office holders
 U.S. Senator from Michigan: James J. Couzens (Republican)
 U.S. Senator from Michigan: Charles E. Townsend (Republican)/ Woodbridge N. Ferris (Democrat)
 House District 1: George P. Codd (Republican)/ Robert H. Clancy (Democrat)
 House District 2: Earl C. Michener (Republican)
 House District 3: John M. C. Smith (Republican)/ Arthur B. Williams (Republican)
 House District 4: John C. Ketcham (Republican)
 House District 5: Carl E. Mapes (Republican)
 House District 6: Patrick H. Kelley (Republican)/ Grant M. Hudson (Republican)
 House District 7: Louis C. Cramton (Republican)
 House District 8: Joseph W. Fordney (Republican)/ Bird J. Vincent (Republican)
 House District 9: James C. McLaughlin (Republican)
 House District 10: Roy O. Woodruff (Republican)
 House District 11: Frank D. Scott (Republican)
 House District 12: W. Frank James (Republican)
 House District 13: Vincent M. Brennan (Republican)/ Clarence J. McLeod (Republican)

Population

Sports

Baseball
 1921 Detroit Tigers season – Under player-manager Ty Cobb, the Tigers compiled a 71–82 record and finished third in the American League. The team's statistical leaders included Harry Heilmann with a .394 batting average, 19 home runs, and 139 RBIs, and Ty Cobb with 124 runs scored. The team's pitching leaders were Howard Ehmke 13 wins and Dutch Leonard with a 3.75 earned run average.

American football
 1921 Michigan Wolverines football team – In their 21st season under head coach Fielding H. Yost, the Wolverines compiled a 5–1–1 record, outscored opponents 187–21, and finished fifth in the Big Ten.
 1921 Michigan Agricultural Aggies football team – Under head coach Albert Barron, the Aggies compiled a 3–5 record and were outscored by opponents, 126 to 68.
 1921 Western State Normal Hilltoppers football team – Under head coach William H. Spaulding, the Hilltoppers compiled a 6–2 record and outscored opponents by a total of 262 to 40.
 1921 Michigan State Normal Normalites football team – Under head coach Joseph McCulloch, the Normalites compiled a record of 3–3 and outscored opponents by a total of 82 to 50.
 1921 Detroit Titans football team – Under head coach James F. Duffy, the Titans compiled an 8–1 record and outscored opponents by a total of 245 to 24.
 1921 Detroit Junior College football team – Under head coach David Holmes, the Detroit Junior College team compiled a 6–0–2 record and outscored opponents by a total of 165 to 0.
 1921 Central Michigan Normalites football team – Under head coach Wallace Parker, Central Michigan compiled a 7–2–1 record.

Basketball
 1920–21 Michigan Wolverines men's basketball team – Under head coach E. J. Mather, the Wolverines compiled an 18–4 record and tied for first in the Big Ten Conference.

Chronology of events

January
 January 4 - Merlin Wiley resigned as Michigan Attorney General
 January 4 - A gunfight in downtown Detroit results in the death of Detroit police detective Daniel J. Couglin.
 January 5 - The announcement of a plan to purchase Isle Royale (later Isle Royale National Park) for $4 million to create a state park is met with opposition to the cost. The Detroit Free Press published front-page stories critical of the acquisition for six consecutive days. Support for the plan waned in face of the opposition.
 January 11 - Plans were announced for construction of the Book Cadillac Hotel in downtown Detroit.

February

March

April

May
 May 9 - Southeastern Michigan recorded record snow fall for the month of May

June

July

August

September

October

November

December

Births
 January 1 -  Milt Jackson, jazz vibraphonist, in Detroit
 March 6 - Ed McMahon, announcer on The Tonight Show Starring Johnny Carson (1962-1992), in Detroit
 April 16 - Vito Giacalone, capo of the Detroit organized crime family
 May 15 - Doris Dowling, actress (The Crimson Key), in Detroit
 May 18 - Don Lund, baseball player, in Detroit
 July 7 - Josephine Clay Ford, philanthropist and granddaughter of Henry Ford, in Dearborn
 August 11 -  Jack O'Dell, civil rights activist and writer, in Detroit
 August 12 - Garry E. Brown, U.S. House of Representatives (1967-1979) 
 November 6 - Robert P. Griffin, U.S. Senator (1966-1979), in Detroit
 1923 - Mitchell Hooks, illustrator, in Detroit

Deaths
 April 17 -  Fred M. Warner, Governor of Michigan (1905-1911), in Orlando, Florida
 November 23 - Oscar Marx, mayor of Detroit (1913-1918), in Detroit
 December 9 - Bill Donovan, Detroit Tigers pitcher (1903-1912), in Forsyth, New York
 1923 - Marvin H. Chamberlain, mayor of Detroit (1886-1887), in Woodstock Township, Michigan

References